Élisabeth Ferrand (1700 - 3 September 1752) was a French salon-holder and philosopher.

A portrait of her by Maurice Quentin de La Tour with the title "Mlle Ferrand Meditating on Newton" is held in the Alte Pinakothek, Munich.

In 1749 Ferrand, along with her friends the Princesse de Talmont and the Comtesse de Vasse, helped Prince Charles Edward Stuart to hide in Paris, sheltering him in a convent and in their homes.

References

1700 births
1752 deaths
18th-century French philosophers
French women philosophers
French salon-holders